Wheeler is the given name of:

People:
 Wheeler R. Baker (born 1946), American politician
 Wheeler Peckham Bloodgood (1871–1930), American lawyer
 Wheeler H. Bristol (1818–1904), American engineer, railroad executive and politician
 Wheeler Winston Dixon (born 1950), American writer of film history, theory and criticism, and professor
 Wheeler Dryden (1892–1957), English actor and film director, half brother of Charlie Chaplin
 Wheeler Martin (1765–1836), justice of the Rhode Island Supreme Court
 Wheeler Milmoe (1898–1972), New York politician
 Wheeler J. North (1922–2002), American marine biologist and environmental scientist
 Wheeler Oakman (1890–1949), American film actor
 Wheeler Hazard Peckham (1833–1905), American lawyer
 Wheeler Thackston (born 1944), American orientalist
 Wheeler Williams (1897–1972), American sculptor

Fictional characters:
 Wheeler, one of the five Planeteers from the animated TV series Captain Planet and the Planeteers
 Wheeler, an alien in the 1968 science fiction novel The Goblin Reservation by Clifford Simak
 Wheeler, an alien in the 1998 science fiction novel Signal to Noise by Eric Nylund

See also 
 Wheeler (surname)
 Wheeler (disambiguation)